Chef Donald is a 1941 American Donald Duck short film directed by Jack King and produced by Walt Disney.

Plot 
Donald is listening to a radio cooking program hosted by Old Mother Mallard and mixes up a batch of waffles, but he's distracted and uses rubber cement instead of baking powder. The batter proves to be unusually stiff. First, his spoon gets stuck and the batter acts like a rubber-band airplane, flying the bowl around the room.

Next, Donald falls with his head in the batter, he tries to get out but initially, he can't (with angry quacking and a lot of bubbles popping), and his tail in the waffle iron. Then he tries to chop it with an ax, and the ax flies up and splits the room in half.

Finally, he throws the bowl out the door; it sticks to the knob while the bowl gets stuck between two trees. The stretching causes a branch to knock on the door, tricking Donald into opening it and letting the batter back in. After several attempts, he has had enough and rushes to the radio studio where the cooking program is being broadcast, and takes his anger out on Old Mother Mallard, believing her to be the source of the trouble, still not knowing about the rubber cement accident.

As he approaches the radio station, the radio starts shaking and wobbling showing that Donald is violently attacking Old Mother Mallard as an act of "revenge".

Cast 
 Clarence Nash as Donald Duck
 Sarah Selby - Old Mother Mallard

Home media
The short was released on May 18, 2004, on Walt Disney Treasures: The Chronological Donald, Volume One: 1934-1941.

References

External links 
 

Donald Duck short films
Films produced by Walt Disney
1941 comedy films
1940s Disney animated short films
1941 animated films
1941 short films
1940s English-language films
American animated short films
RKO Pictures short films
Films about food and drink
American comedy short films
RKO Pictures animated short films